The 2010–11 FIS Snowboard World Cup was a multi race tournament over a season for snowboarding. The season started on 10 October 2010 and ended on 27 March 2011. The World Cup was organised by the FIS which also run world cups and championships in cross-country skiing, ski jumping, Nordic combined, alpine skiing, and freestyle skiing. The snowboarding world cup consisted of the parallel slalom, snowboard cross and the halfpipe. The men's side of the world cup also consisted of a big air competition.

Men

Parallel Slalom

Snowboard Cross

Halfpipe

Big Air

Slopestyle

Ladies

Parallel Slalom

Snowboard Cross

Halfpipe

Slopestyle

Standings

Notes

References

External links
 FIS Snowboarding Calendar

FIS Snowboard World Cup
FIS Snowboard World Cup
FIS Snowboard World Cup